Laken Lockridge is a fictional character from the American soap opera Santa Barbara. She was first portrayed by American actress Julie Ronnie from July 29, 1984 to September 12, 1985, and she returned for a Christmas episode on December 24, 1985. Susan Marie Snyder played the role from May 15, 1987 to January 22, 1988, and the final actress to portray the role was Shell Danielson, from May 31, 1990 to July 19, 1991.  Mary Beth Evans unsuccessfully auditioned for the role of Laken.

Character history
Laken was the part of the very first teen set on the soap, having interfered with Danny Andrade, Jade Perkins and most notably Ted Capwell. Both Laken and Ted knew that their love for one another would be challenged many times, mostly because their families had been rivals for years. Although they battled to stay with each other, the people around used every chance to hurt them, most notably Augusta who had cooked the carrier pigeon that the lovers used to send each other messages. Their love was eventually overshadowed by family problems, and Laken ended up leaving the city for better opportunities.

Laken returned to town in 1987 only to find her family in shatters. Some people left town, and her ex-boyfriend Ted was now married to Hayley Benson. Laken tried to seduce Ted on various occasions, but she didn't manage to win him over. At the time, her father Lionel was dating Caroline Wilson, the mother of Jane Wilson, who had a secret illness, but she promised to keep the illness hidden from everyone else. Then, once again, Laken left town.

The third return for Laken was everything but successful. She returned and fell in love with a movie producer named Steven Slade, but that love was soon shattered. She then found love in the arms of Amado Gonzales, but the man was tragically murdered weeks later. Realizing that, once again, she had nothing to do in town anymore, Laken left town, this time forever.

References

Santa Barbara characters
Television characters introduced in 1984